Bratislav Gašić (born 30 June 1967) is a Serbian politician serving as minister of internal affairs since 2022. A former member of the Serbian Progressive Party (SNS), he served as the minister of defence from 2014 to 2016. He was the director of the Security Intelligence Agency (BIA) from 2017 to 2022.

Education and career
He finished primary and secondary school in Kruševac and the Faculty of Economics within the University of Niš. From 1989, he began entrepreneurship in his native country and later worked many years in Greece. During the 1990s he worked in the coffee industry, mainly in export-import, and was one of the owners of prominent Serbian brands Grand coffee. During the 2000s, he ran several sports clubs in his home city of Kruševac, volleyball and football teams.

2008–17
He is one of the founders of the Serbian Progressive Party, founded in October 2008. Following the 2012 Serbian parliamentary elections when the Serbian Progressive Party took power, he was named the vice president of the party. Later he was named the president of the Executive Board of Srbijagas in March 2013. From June 2012 until April 2014 he was the mayor of Kruševac. He was elected as the Minister of Defence of Serbia on 27 April 2014 following the 2014 Serbian parliamentary elections. On 5 February 2016, he was sacked from the duty following the public pressure due to his sexist remarks towards B92 TV reporter Zlatija Labović, made on 6 December 2015.

2017–present: Head of Security Intelligence Agency
On 23 May 2017, he was appointed as the head of the Security Intelligence Agency (BIA). Following his appointment, he has suspended his party activities.

In August 2017, an amendments to the Law on the Security and Information Agency, which strengthen the authorities of the agency's director, have arrived in the Serbian Parliament for adoption. This move was condemned by several officials including the Commissioner for Information of Public Importance Rodoljub Šabić and former co-Minister of Internal Affairs of Serbia Božo Prelević. They have stated that these amendments are unconstitutional and thus way creating a platform for "party's intelligence agency" (Serbian Progressive Party), aimed at the opposition and "domestic traitors" who disagree with the ruling regime.

Personal life
He is married and has three sons. He speaks English and Greek. His nickname is Bata Santos, given to him due to business with coffee.

References

External links

1967 births
Living people
Politicians from Kruševac
Government ministers of Serbia
University of Niš alumni
Defence ministers of Serbia
Serbian Progressive Party politicians